Lesticus buqueti is a species of ground beetle in the subfamily Pterostichinae. It was described by Castelnau in 1834.

References

Lesticus
Beetles described in 1834